Carlos Francisco Diaz (born December 24, 1964) is a former Major League Baseball catcher. He batted and threw right-handed.

Diaz attended Oklahoma State University, and in 1984 he played collegiate summer baseball with the Falmouth Commodores of the Cape Cod Baseball League.

He was selected by the Blue Jays in the 14th round of the 1986 MLB Draft. He is currently residing in Safety Harbor, Florida and as of August 2018 is Vice Mayor on city council.

References

External links

1964 births
Living people
American expatriate baseball players in Canada
Baseball players from Jersey City, New Jersey
Colorado Springs Sky Sox players
Denver Zephyrs players
Dunedin Blue Jays players
Falmouth Commodores players
Knoxville Blue Jays players
Major League Baseball catchers
Medicine Hat Blue Jays players
Memphis Chicks players
Omaha Royals players
St. Catharines Blue Jays players
Syracuse Chiefs players
Toronto Blue Jays players
Ventura County Gulls players
Oklahoma State Cowboys baseball players